Anemosella obliquata is a species of snout moth in the genus Anemosella. It was described by Henry Edwards in 1886, and is known from the US state of Texas.

References

Moths described in 1886
Chrysauginae
Moths of North America